Factor X is a Chilean television music competition show, to find new singing talent; the winner of which receives a recording contract with a record label. The first season of the show  debuted on March 3, 2011, and will be aired on Thursday and Sunday. The auditions were in January 2011 and where more than 10.000 people arrived throughout the process. It will be hosted by Julián Elfenbein, the same host of the other recent successful talent show Talento Chileno, the Chilean versión of the Got Talent franchise. It will be the second version of this format made in Latin America after the Colombian El factor X shows, but the first to meet the new requirements of the franchise in the level of production. The judges for this season are Zeta Bosio, Karen Doggenweiler and Tito Beltrán, with Nydia Caro as guest judge.

Selection process

Auditions

In January 2011 massive auditions started in search of contestants including casting in Santiago and various regions. Initial auditions were held in Concepción which is known as "The Chilean capital of rock" and is home to many artists and La Serena, a city that brings large crowds of people in summer season.

The casting process was formally launched with the release of the application forms on the official website of the competition, released on December 10, 2010. The website announced four categories of participants, soloists, duos, trios and vocal groups and the age limit to join the program was set at 14 years. For groups, a maximum of six members would be allowed.

The initial auditions would be held in front of the producers, and a certain number of them would qualify to sing in front of the judges. Auditions would be held in the Mall Plaza chain of shopping malls in three cities and will begin at 10:30 and running each day until 21:30. In each of the three cities where auditions will be held, with the presence of three permanent judges in addition to a different guest judge in each city, well known nationally or internationally. In Concepción, after applicant sang to the producers at the local Mall Plaza chain, they moved to the stage before the judges at Marina del Sol Theatre on 13 and 14 January 2011, making also their first recordings for the program. The permanent jury was composed of Zeta Bosio, Karen Doggenweiler, Tito Beltran whereas Nydia Caro served as guest judge. More than 3,000 people applied. After round for casting in front of the production team, there was a pre-selected round for appearing in front of specialists, including the "vocal couch" during the implementation of the program. In this phase, 200 applicants were selected for new hearings held on January 13, where between 80 and 100 of them would be finally presented to the permanent jury end of the same week. On January 18, 2011, the casting was seeking for people selected to audition in Santiago, the site reached more than 5,000 people, of which about 500 spent the night in tents outside the place. The stage of auditions in front of the judges was between 20—22 January at the installations of Televisión Nacional de Chile. On January 26, made the selection process at La Serena, where 2,000 people came. The auditions in front of the judges in the city of La Serena were performed in the historic city Centennial Theatre.

Dates

Bootcamp
The workshop phase is the second phase of the program to be broadcast in two chapters, these chapters will gather all people classified in the stage of hearings in Santiago to face a series of tests within the workshops and work to prepare a particular song and choreography, this is where they were also presented to the contestants the task force, composed by the choreographer, vocal coach and music producer in this part they work and divided into categories.

In these so-called "workshops", the nominees of the casting mass, which border the 150 people, will be presented to the jury again, but this time without an audience, where it will become an important selection of 24 participants to leave once they finish "Workshops" will be eight per category.

Judges' houses
Thereafter come two emissions that are called "Judges' houses", when the participants will sing in a house where they will receive each juror who already has that category, that is, at that moment learn that the jury will be your advocate and will work with them as a mentor, adding that each juror is inviting another famous, i.e. a special guest to help the jury to decide and there auditioning for and the last eight of each category are only four. Being a total of 12 selected, which will be part of the gala live.

The twelve eliminated acts were:
 14-24s: Constanza Despouy, Dominique Leiva, Giezy Carrasco, Vannia Aguilar
 Over 25s: Joaquín Aguilar, Gianfranco Malinconi, Matthew Wiggan, Liliana Olivos
 Groups: Galaxia, Cómplices, Our Dream, Deep Skin

Contestants 

 – Winner
 – Runner-up
 – Third Place

Live shows 
There will be ten live broadcast episodes in which participants must present songs with various themes. There will also be daily presentations by guest artists. There will also be weekly eliminations according to public vote and judges' decisions.

Results summary 
Colour key

Live show details

Live Show 1 (7 April)
Theme: Contestant's choice
Celebrity performers: None

Judge's vote to eliminate
 Bosio: María Paz Duarte
 Doggenweiler: María Paz Duarte
 Beltrán: Jennifer López

Live Show 2 (11 April)
Theme: Top 20s Hits from all time
Celebrity performers: None

Judge's vote to eliminate
 Bosio: Dulce Tabú
 Doggenweiler: Aduana
 Beltrán: Aduana

Live Show 3 (14 April)
Theme: Dance songs
Celebrity performers: None

Judge's vote to eliminate
 Bosio: Dulce Tabú
 Doggenweiler: Jeniffer López
 Beltrán: Jeniffer López

Live Show 4 (18 April)
Theme: Greatest Hits from All Time
Celebrity performers: None

Judge's vote to eliminate
 Bosio: MB & J
 Doggenweiler: Tania Giordano
 Beltrán: Tania Giordano

Live Show 5 (21 April)
Theme: Free
Celebrity performers: None

Judge's vote to eliminate
 Bosio: Agnus
 Doggenweiler: Agnus
 Beltrán: Dulce Tabú

Live Show 6 (25 April)
Theme: 80's Songs
Celebrity performers: Heather Kunst ("Sweet Dreams (Are Made of This)")

Judge's vote to eliminate
 Bosio: Dulce Tabú
 Doggenweiler: Paolo Ramírez
 Beltrán: Dulce Tabú

Live Show 7 (28 April)
Theme: Viña del Mar International Song Festival
Celebrity performers: Liliana Olivos ("Baño de Mar a Medianoche")

Judge's vote to eliminate
 Bosio: Héctor Nuñez
 Doggenweiler: Héctor Nuñez
 Beltrán: MB & J

Live Show 8 (2 May)
Theme: Free
Celebrity performers: None

 For the first time in the series, there was no final showdown and the act that received the fewest public votes was automatically eliminated. This was Paolo Ramírez.

Live Show 9 (5 May)
Theme: Free
Celebrity performers: Aleks Syntek ("Duele el Amor" / "Más de 1000 Años")

There was, again, no final showdown, and MB & J was eliminated having received the fewest votes.

Live Show 10 (10 May)
Theme: Mentor's favourite performance from the competition; celebrity duet; contestant's choice.
Group performance: "Looking for Paradise" (performed by all 12 finalists)
Celebrity duet performers: 
 Natalino with Madriela Marchant
 Andrés de León with Stanley Weissohn
 Amaya Forch with Sergio Jarlaz

Reception

Ratings

References

External links
  

Chile 01
2011 Chilean television seasons

es:Factor X (Chile)